The SFU Red Leafs football or Simon Fraser Red Leafs football team has represented Simon Fraser University since the athletic department's inception in 1965. The team played by American rules while they competed in the National Association of Intercollegiate Athletics from 1965 to 2001 against other American teams. Along with other SFU teams, the football program transferred to Canadian Interuniversity Sport (now U Sports) and thereby switched to playing Canadian football against Canadian University teams in 2002. While playing in the CIS, SFU won its first and only Hardy Trophy conference championship in 2003 while qualifying for the playoffs twice. After playing eight seasons in the Canada West Conference of the CIS, the football team began competing in the Great Northwest Athletic Conference of NCAA Division II in 2010, and have played the American format of football again since. After the GNAC dropped football after the 2021 season, SFU and the other two GNAC members that still sponsored the sport became football-only members of the Lone Star Conference.

The team previously used the names "Clansmen" and "Clan;" those names were retired in 2020.  The new nickname "Red Leafs" was announced in September 2022.

Rivalry
The team had maintained a cross-town rivalry with the Vancouver-based University of British Columbia Thunderbirds as they are also the only two universities in British Columbia that field football teams. Since 1967, the two teams have competed in the Shrum Bowl, an annual game played at alternating venues with alternating rules. SFU holds a 17–16–1 series lead after winning in three consecutive years from 2008 to 2010 to claim the lead. Due to the two schools playing in two different leagues, the scheduling of these games has often been difficult, with no game being played from 2011 to 2021. The Shrum Bowl was revived an played again on December 2, 2022, where UBC defeated SFU 18-17 under American rules.

Season results

(*) In 2009, two victories were nullified because CWUAA accused SFU for having ineligible players in both games. However, SFU argued that they followed CWUAA's guidelines perfectly and that the player was eligible at the time of the accusation. The Manitoba Bisons also used an ineligible player in a Simon Fraser win, so the game was declared "no contest."

CIS playoff results

2002 Out of Playoffs
2003 Defeated Regina Rams in semi-final 53–46Defeated Alberta Golden Bears in Hardy Cup 28–18Lost to Saint Mary's Huskies in Uteck Bowl 60–9
2004 Out of Playoffs
2005 Out of Playoffs
2006 Out of Playoffs
2007 Out of Playoffs
2008 Defeated Saskatchewan Huskies in semi-final 40–30Lost to Calgary Dinos in Hardy Cup 44–21
2009 Out of Playoffs

Red Leafs in the CFL

Since the program first began in 1965, Simon Fraser University has had the most first overall selections with five.

As of the end of the 2022 CFL season, five former SFU players were on CFL teams' rosters:
Michael Couture, Winnipeg Blue Bombers
Lemar Durant, Hamilton Tiger-Cats
Jordan Herdman-Reed, Saskatchewan Roughriders
Justin Herdman-Reed, Saskatchewan Roughriders
Ante Milanovic-Litre, Edmonton Elks

Red Leafs in the NFL

Former SFU wide receiver Victor Marshall was invited to the Seattle Seahawks rookie camp in May 2013 and earned a contract on May 13 to take part in Organized Team Activities and training camp as a tight end. On July 30, 2013 the Seahawks released Marshall during training camp.

On April 27, 2018, former SFU DE Nathan Shepherd was selected 72nd overall in the 2018 NFL draft by the New York Jets and made the 53-man roster out of training camp. As of the end of the 2020 NFL season, Shepherd was on the Jets' roster.

References

External links
 

 
Sports clubs established in 1965
1965 establishments in British Columbia